Saifulrizal Abdul Latif is the incumbent 13th Commander of the Royal Brunei Land Forces (RBLF) since 2022.

Education 
After graduating from the Royal Military Academy Sandhurst (RMAS) in the United Kingdom, Saifulrizal joined the Royal Brunei Armed Forces (RBAF) on 24 November 1995 and was commissioned as a Second Lieutenant in 1997. He got the chance to take a variety of courses and seminars throughout his career, both domestically and overseas. The Malaysian Armed Forces Defence College from 2019 to 2020, the RBAF Executive Development Programme (EDP) in 2015, and the RBAF Command & Staff Course in 2011 were among the courses he took. The Republic of Korea Counter-Terrorist Course (707th Special Mission Battalion) in 2004, the Australian Grade 2 Command & Tactics Course in 2009, the Singapore Armed Forces Advanced Infantry Officer Training in 2008, and numerous other special operations courses.

Military career
Saifulrizal has held numerous staff and command positions throughout his time in the military. Prior to being chosen for the Special Forces (SF) in 1998, he worked as a platoon leader with the Third Battalion RBLF upon his return to Brunei. He served as a Troop Leader in the Diving Troop Special Combat Squadron (SCS) from 1998 to 2002 after passing SF Selection. Thereafter, from 2002 to 2004, he served as the SCS Training Officer. In 2005, he was named the SCS Second-in-Command. In 2006, he was sent to the RBLF and given the position of Commanding Officer of the Third Battalion RBLF. Upon his return to the SF, he was named Operations Officer from 2009 to 2013, and from 2013 to 2016 he served as Commanding Officer of the Special Forces Regiment.

Saifulrizal began working as the Sultan Hassanal Bolkiah's Aide-de-Camp in 2016 and held the position through 2019. His most recent positions were as the Deputy Joint Force Commander from January 2022 to June 2022 and as the Chief of Staff of the Joint Force Headquarters, RBAF from 2020 to 2022. From 10 June 2022, he has been the 13th Commander of the Royal Brunei Land Force. Two days later, Counsellor Derek Chollet visited Brunei from 12 to 13 June. During his brief visit, the Counsellor met with Saifulrizal, accompanied by Caryn McClelland.

He was promoted to the rank of Brigadier General with effect from 17 June 2022, according to Sultan Hassanal Bolkiah's approval. At the Bolkiah Garrison Officer's Mess, the Commander of the Royal Brunei Armed Forces, Haszaimi Bol Hassan, concluded the promotion ceremony for Colonel Saifulrizal. The launching ceremony of Exercise Maju Bersama at Kranji Camp was co-officiated by Chief of Army Major General David Neo and Saifulrizal bin Abdul Latif, which would last from 21 to 30 November 2022.

Personal life
Two sons and a girl have been born to Saifulrizal and his wife, Ampuan Datin Yura Kasumawati binti Dato Paduka Haji Mohd Adnan.

Honours 

  Order of Pahlawan Negara Brunei First Class (PSPNB) – Dato Seri Pahlawan (15 July 2022)
   Order of Seri Paduka Mahkota Brunei  Third Class (SMB) – (2017)
  Golden Jubilee Medal – (5 October 2017)
  General Service Medal (Armed Forces)
  Long Service Medal (Armed Forces)
  Royal Brunei Armed Forces Golden Jubilee Medal – (31 May 2011)

References

Living people
Bruneian military leaders
Year of birth missing (living people)